MacKillop College may refer to several Catholic schools in Australia named in honour of Mary MacKillop:

Clairvaux MacKillop College, formally MacKillop College and Clairvaux College, Upper Mount Gravatt, Queensland
MacKillop College, Bathurst, New South Wales
MacKillop Catholic College, Palmerston, Northern Territory
MacKillop College, Mornington, Tasmania
MacKillop College, Swan Hill, Victoria
Mary MacKillop College, Wakeley, New South Wales
Mary MacKillop College, Kensington, South Australia
Mary MacKillop Catholic Regional College, Leongatha, Victoria
St Mary Mackillop College, Busselton, Western Australia
MacKillop Catholic College, Warnervale, New South Wales
MacKillop Catholic Regional College, Werribee, Victoria
Mary MacKillop Catholic Regional College, South Gippsland, Victoria
Penola Catholic College, Victoria
St Mary MacKillop College, Canberra, Australian Capital Territory
Mary MacKillop Catholic Parish Primary School, Birkdale, Queensland

See also 
McKillop (disambiguation)
Mary MacKillop (disambiguation)